Sir Arthur Olver FRSE CB CMG (1875 – 15 August 1961) was a 20th-century British army officer and expert on animal husbandry. He was one of the first to advocate livestock registration and monitoring of pedigree and animal movements to control the potential spread of disease and to ensure quality control.

Life
He was born in 1875 the son of Robert Sobey Olver (1832-1913) of Trescowe House near Bodmin in Cornwall, and his wife, Mary Ann Jane Sobey. Robert was an agriculturalist.

He was educated at Godolphin School, then studied at the Royal Veterinary College, London. In 1899 he joined the Royal Army Veterinary Corps, seeing active service in the Second Boer War in South Africa. In 1906 he was posted to Egypt and then the Sudan in 1907. In the First World War he was Mentioned in Dispatches three times and rose to the rank of Battalion Lt Colonel. From 1922 to 1927 he again served in Egypt.

He spent most of his final years in India.

In 1939 he was elected a Fellow of the Royal Society of Edinburgh. His proposers were Sir Thomas Henry Holland, Sir Thomas Hudson Beare, James Ritchie and Francis Albert Eley Crew.

He died in a London hospital on 15 August 1961.

Family
In 1914 he married Marjorie Beart.

Publications
A Brief Survey of Some of the Important Breeds of Cattle in India (1938)

Footnotes

1875 births
1961 deaths
19th-century British Army personnel
20th-century British Army personnel
19th-century British medical doctors
20th-century British medical doctors
20th-century British writers
Alumni of the Royal Veterinary College
British Army personnel of the Second Boer War
British Army personnel of World War I
British veterinarians
Companions of the Order of the Bath
Companions of the Order of St Michael and St George
Fellows of the Royal Society of Edinburgh
People from Bodmin
People from Cornwall
Royal Army Veterinary Corps officers